Irene Maria Sabadini is an Italian mathematician specializing in complex analysis, hypercomplex analysis and the analysis of superoscillations. She is a professor of mathematics at the Polytechnic University of Milan.

Education
Sabadini earned her PhD at the University of Milan in 1996. Her dissertation, Toward a Theory of Quaternionic Hyperfunctions, was supervised by Daniele C. Struppa.

Books
Sabadini is the author of multiple books in mathematics including:
Analysis of Dirac systems and computational algebra (with Colombo, Sommen, and Struppa, Birkhäuser 2004)
Noncommutative functional calculus: Theory and applications of slice hyperholomorphic functions (with Colombo and Struppa, Birkhäuser/Springer, 2011)
Entire slice regular functions (with Colombo and Struppa, Springer, 2016)
Slice hyperholomorphic Schur analysis (with Alpay and Colombo, Birkhäuser/Springer, 2016)
The mathematics of superoscillations (with Aharonov, Colombo, Struppa, and Tollaksen, American Mathematical Society, 2017)
Quaternionic approximation: With application to slice regular functions (with Gal, Birkhäuser/Springer, 2019)
Quaternionic de Branges spaces and characteristic operator function (Springer, 2020)
Michele Sce's works in hypercomplex analysis: A translation with commentaries (with Colombo and Struppa, Birkhäuser/Springer, 2020)
She is also the editor or coeditor of multiple edited volumes.

References

External links

Living people
Italian mathematicians
Italian women mathematicians
Functional analysts
University of Milan alumni
Academic staff of the Polytechnic University of Milan
Year of birth missing (living people)